The Empress State Building is a high rise building on the West Brompton/Earl's Court border in the London Borough of Hammersmith and Fulham (West London). Its full address is Empress State Building, Empress Approach, Lillie Road, West Brompton, London, SW6 1TR.

History
The building is named after the Empress Hall which formerly stood on the site, and in tribute to the Empire State Building. It was renovated in 2003 to a design by Wilkinson Eyre Architects. Plus a frontal extension of 5 meters 'Orbit' is the name given to the private revolving bar on the top floor which offers panoramic views of London.The revolving bar element was shut down

This building was originally designed as a hotel but was first used by the Admiralty and GCHQ. The Directorate of Naval Shore Telecommunications (formerly the Naval Shore Telecommunications Authority) had their national headquarters in the building in the 1980s and 90s.

Metropolitan Police offices 
The building is occupied by staff from the Metropolitan Police Service who refer to it as ESB. Among other things, until 2020 the building was home to the assessment centre for prospective police officers. Some of the upper floors were occupied by staff from Transport for London until 2010. An annexe at the entrance to the site housed the Metropolitan Police Heritage Centre until January 2020.

In March 2018 the London mayor's office agreed to buy the ESB estate for its MPS operations from Capco Plc, the developer of the adjacent Earl's Court regeneration scheme, for £250 million to house a new Counter Terrorism Operations Centre combining police and intelligence agencies' counter-terrorism units. Funding for that project was confirmed in November 2020 and the building is expected to re-open in that role by late 2025.

On 15 October 2019 the building received a Certificate of Immunity from listing by the then Secretary of State for Digital, Culture, Media and Sport, Nicky Morgan, which is due to expire on 14 October 2024.

See also
Tall buildings in London
Imre Kiralfy

References

Works cited

External links

From emporis.com

Office buildings completed in 1961
Skyscrapers in the London Borough of Hammersmith and Fulham
Buildings and structures in the London Borough of Hammersmith and Fulham
History of the London Borough of Hammersmith and Fulham
Earls Court
West Brompton
Skyscraper office buildings in London
Metropolitan Police administrative buildings